Marlon G. Fletcher (July 29, 1971 – May 22, 2003), better known under his stage name Big DS, was an American hardcore rapper and record producer from Queens, New York.

He was co-founder of the hardcore rap group Onyx. As a part of Onyx Big DS released one album "Bacdafucup" and 8 singles on JMJ Records and featured on 1993's Judgment Night (soundtrack). As a part of Onyx Big DS was nominated as "Rap/Hip-Hop New Artist" on American Music Awards of 1994 and won "Best Rap Album" on 1994 Soul Train Music Awards.

Early life
Fletcher was born in South Ozone Park, Queens, New York City, New York. He studied at John Adams High School (Queens). In 1988, after graduating from school at the age of 17, Fredro Starr created the rap group Onyx along with his schoolmates Big DS and Suavé (also known as Sonny Seeza). Big DS came up with the name for the group, he named it after the black stone Onyx. They began to make the first demos in the basement of B-Wiz with drum machine beats from an SP-12.

Career
In 1989, Onyx signed Jeffrey Harris as their manager, who helped them secure a contract with the label Profile Records. In 1990, at York Studio in Brooklyn, they recorded their first single, "Ah, And We Do It Like This", which was released to low sales on April 25, 1990 on Profile.

Big DS and Suave first met Jam Master Jay at Rev Run's wedding in 1990. They met again in a traffic jam at The Jones Beach GreekFest Festival on July 13, 1991. Jay gave them about two months to get a demo, but Suave and Big DS couldn't make it to the studio to record the demo. They were replaced on the demo by Fredro Starr's cousin, Sticky Fingaz, who at that time was pursuing a solo career under the name Trop. Fredro and Jones recorded two records for the demo, "Stik 'N' Muve" and "Exercise", which Jam Master Jay liked enough to sign the group to his label, JMJ Records.

Big DS left the group in 1994 to start a solo career. Big DS founded his own label Illyotic Music and started producing music. After recording a few demos, Big DS sent them to Jimmy Iovine, co-owner of Interscope Records, in the hope of signing a contract with his label for the release of the album.

Death
On May 22, 2003, Big DS died in a hospital in Queens after receiving chemotherapy as a result of lymphatic cancer at 31 years old.

Discography
With Onyx
1993: Bacdafucup

Solo albums
1994: Demo Tape

Awards and nominations

Filmography

Video game appearances
 Rap Jam: Volume One (1995) as Big DS

References

External links
Marlon Fletcher at Discogs

Big DS at RapGenius

African-American male rappers
Musicians from Queens, New York
Rappers from New York City
Hardcore hip hop artists
1971 births
2003 deaths
20th-century American male musicians
20th-century African-American musicians
21st-century African-American people
Deaths from cancer in New York (state)